The Véhicule Blindé Multi-Rôle Griffon (English: Multirole Armoured Vehicle Griffon) or VBMR Griffon is a French multi-purpose armoured personnel carrier developed and manufactured by Nexter in cooperation with Arquus and Thales. Entering operational service in 2019, it will, alongside the four-wheeled VBMR-L Serval variant, succeed the Véhicule de l'Avant Blindé (VAB).

History
The French army has been preparing to replace the VAB since the early 2000s. According to the Army's 2020 Defense White Paper it plans to buy up to 2,122 VBMR vehicles between 2018 and 2025. A consortium of Nexter, Thales, and Arquus (formerly named Renault Trucks Defense) is building the vehicles. The same consortium also builds the EBRC Jaguar reconnaissance and combat vehicle for the French Army, which shares 70% of its components with the VBMR Griffon.

On 6 December 2014, French Defense Minister Jean-Yves Le Drian announced that deliveries will commence in 2018 and a first tranche of 319 Griffons and 20 Jaguars was ordered in April 2017. A second tranche for 271 Griffons and 42 Jaguars was ordered on 24 September 2020. In total the French Army plans to buy 1,872 Griffons and 300 Jaguars.

On 26 October 2018, Belgium's cabinet formalized the plan to purchase 60 "Jaguar" and 382 “Griffon” vehicles for €1.5 billion. The vehicles will replace the Belgian Army's Piranha IIIC armored personnel carriers and Dingo 2 infantry mobility vehicles. The deal includes spare parts and secure communications equipment and deliveries are planned to commence in 2025.

Design
The vehicle is based on a 6×6 commercial all-terrain truck chassis and will carry up to eight infantry soldiers. The consortium building the "Griffon" and "Jaguar" is contractually obliged to keep the price per Griffon under €1 million. Currently, six versions of the Griffon are planned, with four of these (Armored Personnel Carrier, Command Post, Ambulance, and Artillery Observer) ordered in the first tranche.

The vehicles are designed for simple maintenance and logistics. For example, Griffon and Jaguar both use standard commercial truck engines, which have been adapted to use a wider range of fuel. The vehicle has an overpressure system to maintain constant protection to the troop compartment against chemical, biological and radiological threats. For service in hot climates, the Griffon is equipped with air conditioning.

Armament
The Griffon is equipped with a remote weapons station that can be armed with either a 12.7mm or 7.62mm machine gun, or a 40mm automatic grenade launcher. The addition of two Akeron MP anti-tank guided missiles is optional. Eight launchers for smoke grenades are fitted to the remote weapon station, which also includes an acoustic sniper localisation system.

VBMR-L Serval

Complementing the heavier Griffon armoured vehicle, the Véhicule Blindé Multi-Rôle Léger Serval (English: "Lightweight Multirole Armored Vehicle Serval") or VBMR-L Serval is also intended as a replacement for the VAB. 4-wheeled and designed to operate in areas of contact with the enemy, it is particularly maneuverable and will primarily equip infantry units of light brigades such as the 11th Airborne Brigade and the 27th Mountain Infantry Brigade. The contract for the French Army was awarded in February 2018, which included funding for 489 units by 2025, reaching 978 vehicles by 2030.

Furthermore, 1060 additional Serval VLTP P segment haut (multipurpose light tactical vehicles) will also be purchased  by 2033.

Variants

VBMR Griffon

VTT: Armoured personnel carrier
EPC/VOA: Armoured command and artillery observation vehicle
MEPAC: Armoured mortar carrier
Ambulance/Santé: Armoured medical evacuation vehicle
Génie: Armoured combat engineering vehicle
NRBC: Armoured CBRN defense vehicle

VBMR-L Serval
VPB: Armoured personnel carrier
SA2R: Armoured ISTAR vehicle
NCT: Armoured communications vehicle

Operators

  - Ordered 382 units of the VBMR Griffon in October 2018.
  - Planned purchase of 1872 units of the VBMR Griffon and 978 units of the VBMR-L Serval by 2030. An additional 1060 Serval VLTP P segment haut vehicles to be purchased by 2033.

References

External links
Metravib Defence

Wheeled armoured personnel carriers
Armoured personnel carriers of France
Nexter Systems
Six-wheeled vehicles
Military vehicles introduced in the 2010s
Armoured personnel carriers of the post–Cold War period